Grenada competed at the 2013 World Championships in Athletics from August 10 to August 18 in Moscow, Russia.
A team of 2 athletes was announced to represent the country in the event.

Results

(q – qualified, NM – no mark, SB – season best)

Men

Decathlon

References

Nations at the 2013 World Championships in Athletics
World Championships in Athletics
Grenada at the World Championships in Athletics